Navaghana was a Chudasama king of Saurashtra region of western India who reigned from 1306 CE to 1308 CE (VS 1362 to VS 1364). His capital was at Junagadh.

Reign
Navaghana was of middle age when he succeeded his father Mandalika I. He is also mentioned in the genealogy in inscriptions at Neminath Temple (c. VS 1510/c. 1454 CE) on Girnar where he is praised as a mighty warrior. This inscription calls the Chudasamas of the Yadava origin. During his short reign of two years, he had installed Shivalinga in the Somanatha temple which was destroyed during reign of his father. He probably died in a local conflict with Muslims in 1308 CE. He  was succeeded by his son Mahipala I.

Notes

References

Chudasama dynasty
14th-century Indian monarchs